Hans-Joachim Berndt (born 8 June 1949) is a former German sailor who competed in the 1972 Summer Olympics.

References

1949 births
Living people
German male sailors (sport)
Olympic sailors of West Germany
Sailors at the 1972 Summer Olympics – Soling